Warren Grant "Sheriff" Robinson (September 8, 1921 – April 5, 2002) was an American catcher and manager in minor league baseball and a coach and scout for the New York Mets of Major League Baseball. A native of Cambridge, Maryland, he earned his nickname from schoolmates after his father, William Lincoln Grant Robinson, twice ran unsuccessfully for the office of sheriff of Dorchester County, which is situated on the Eastern Shore of Maryland.

Minor league playing and managing career
He signed his first professional baseball contract with the St. Louis Cardinals and reached the highest level of the minor leagues at age 19 with the 1941 Rochester Red Wings of the International League. However, Robinson would never reach the Major Leagues as a player. With the exception of a three-year (1943–45) tour of duty in military service during World War II, he caught in the International League with Rochester and the minor league edition of the Baltimore Orioles through the middle of the 1949 season, when he was acquired by the Boston Red Sox' Louisville Colonels farm club.

The following season, he became a playing coach in Boston's farm system, with the San Jose Red Sox. In 1953, he received his first managerial assignment as skipper of the Bosox' Salisbury Rocots Class D affiliate in the Tar Heel League. Robinson swiftly worked his way upward as a minor league manager in the Boston organization, winning a championship with the Corning Red Sox of the Pennsylvania–Ontario–New York League (PONY League) in 1954 and 98 games for the second-place San Jose club in the 1955 California League.

In 1957–58, Robinson managed Double-A clubs for Boston in the Texas League (with the Oklahoma City Indians) and the Southern Association (with the Memphis Chicks). However, a housecleaning in the Red Sox front office at the close of the 1960 season resulted in the departure of the team's farm system director, Johnny Murphy, and Robinson joined the New York Yankees for two seasons, managing the Amarillo Gold Sox to the 1961 Texas League pennant and helming the Triple-A Richmond Virginians in 1962.

Career with New York Mets
He joined the Mets in 1963, their sophomore season, reunited with Murphy, who was a vice president in the club's front office. His first post was as the skipper of the Quincy Jets of the Class A Midwest League.

In 1964, Robinson was called up to the Mets for the first of three different terms as a Major League coach. That season, he served as bullpen coach under Casey Stengel. After spending a half-season as manager of the Mets' Buffalo Bisons Triple-A farm club in 1965, he returned to New York in midyear to work as the bullpen coach for the Mets' new manager, Wes Westrum, serving through 1967.

Robinson would spend the next decade as a scout for the Mets, except for the 1972 season. That April, he was appointed the Mets' first-base coach to fill the vacancy on the coaching staff left by Yogi Berra's promotion to manager following the sudden death of Gil Hodges.

Sheriff Robinson died in Cambridge, aged 80, in 2002. His record as a minor league manager, over 12 seasons, was 786–821 (.489).

References

 Duxbury, John, and Kachline, Clifford, eds., The Baseball Register, 1967 edition. St. Louis: The Sporting News, 1967.

External links

Coach's page from Retrosheet
 Baltimore Sun obituary

1921 births
2002 deaths
Baltimore Orioles (IL) players
Baseball players from Maryland
Buffalo Bisons (minor league) managers
Hamilton Red Wings (baseball) players
Louisville Colonels (minor league) players
Major League Baseball bullpen coaches
Major League Baseball first base coaches
New York Mets coaches
New York Mets scouts
People from Cambridge, Maryland
Rochester Red Wings players
Salisbury Rocots players
San Jose Red Sox players
Scranton Red Sox players
Williamson Colts players
United States Navy personnel of World War II